"Chase That Feeling" a song by Australian group, Hilltop Hoods. It was released for download on 8 May 2009 and as a CD single on 22 May 2009. and is the lead single from the group's fifth studio album, State of the Art.  

The song features a return guest appearance by a quartet of members from the Adelaide Symphony Orchestra. The music video had its worldwide premiere on the YouTube homepage on Friday 1 May 2009. It samples "Pass the Word (Love Is the Word)" by the doo wop group The Mad Lads.

"Chase That Feeling" reached number 8 on the ARIA Singles Chart, and was voted in at number 3 in Triple J's Hottest 100 for 2009.

Track listing

Credits
 Graphic design – Benjamin Funnell 
 Illustration – John Engelhardt 
 Mastering – Neville Clark

Charts

Weekly charts

Year-end charts

Certifications

Release history

References

2009 singles
2009 songs
Golden Era Records singles
Hilltop Hoods songs
Songs written by Suffa
Songs written by MC Pressure